The White House chief calligrapher is responsible for the design and execution of all social and official documents at the White House, the official residence and principal workplace of the president of the United States.

The chief calligrapher works in the East Wing of the White House in the Graphics and Calligraphy Office with two deputy calligraphers. Projects of the chief calligrapher range from official invitations to state dinners, official greetings from the president, proclamations, military commissions, service awards, and place cards.

The current White House Chief Calligrapher is Lee Ann Clark. In 2018, the Chief Calligrapher's salary was $104,200.

List of Chief Calligraphers

Rick Paulus (1998–2006)
Pat Blair (2006–2018)
Lee Ann Clark (2019–present)

References

 Clinton, Hillary Rodham. An Invitation to the White House: At Home with History. Simon & Schuster: 2000. .
 Garrett, Wendell. Our Changing White House. Northeastern University Press: 1995. .
 Hawkes Patterson, Bradley. The White House Staff: Inside the West Wing and Beyond. Brookings Institution Press: 2000. .

External links
 Official White House website
 The White House Historical Association, with historical photos, online tours and exhibits, timelines, and facts

American calligraphers
White House
White House Executive Residence Operations
White House Chief Calligrapher